Loacker S.p.A. (in German Loacker AG) is an Italian confectionery company, based in South Tyrol, Italy and specialized in the production of wafers, chocolate and derivative products.

History
The company was founded in 1925 in the historic city center of Bolzano by the Austrian confectioner Alfons Loacker. Back then, he opened a small store with two assistants in the capital of South Tyrol, at Piazza Domenicani to be precise. Over the years, the confectionery store became too small until 1974 marked the transition from a small regional bakery to an industrial reality, by moving away from the city. Armin Loacker, Alfon's son, chose the Renon plateau in the heart of the Dolomites (a UNESCO Natural World Heritage site) to produce his own wafers, thereby abiding by his motto: "a natural product is manufactured in a natural environment."

Manufacturing 
Loacker nowadays has two plants, one in Auna di Sotto on the Renon and a second one in Heinfels in East Tyrol (Austria). At both production sites wafers and chocolate specialties are produced at more than 1,000 meters above sea level. Today, the third generation leads the company: Armin's sons Andreas and Martin Loacker together with his nephew Ulrich Zuenelli who works as executive chairman.

According to the latest data concerning the South Tyrolean company, Loacker has 1,056 employees. In 2021 alone 966 million pieces were produced and 37,534 tons of products were sold which amounted to net sales of 373.06 million Euros. Italy, Saudi Arabia and Israel were the highest consuming countries, followed by the United States and China.

In 2022 Loacker announced the initiation of a multi-year partnership with Sammontana for the production of a new range of Loacker-branded ice creams.

Products and ingredients 
The Napolitaner (Hazelnut) flavored ranges are amongst Loacker's best-known products. The name "Napolitaner" derives from the hazelnuts which represent the main ingredient of the cream in the wafers and used to be sourced from plantations near Naples.

Nowadays, Loacker has initiated four sustainability pathways for both production and sourcing of raw materials, aiming to increase verticalization of its own supply chain.

In addition to the vanilla Bourbon pods from Madagascar and the cocoa beans cultivated in Ecuador and the Ivory Coast, Loacker uses milk powder from Dolomites Milk in Vandoies for its dairy creams. Dolomites Milk is a joint venture between Loacker and the South Tyrolean dairy cooperative BRIMI which comprises 1,100 local farmers. This 10,000 m2 facility is the first plant which is specialized in whey and milk powder in Italy.

Loacker covers part of its hazelnut supply needs through products coming from two company-owned farms located in Tuscany and orchards of 90 more farms which are part of a cultivation project with based on supply chain contracts in Veneto, Umbria, Tuscany and Marche.

Furthermore, Loacker distributes products branded by Lorenz, Pema, Twinings, Ovomaltine and Darbo in Italy.

Loacker Café 
Besides the production and sale of its own products to both small and large distributors, the group also comprises five Loacker Cafés, all of which are located in Tyrol.

These Cafés represent a mix between a store, where the entire Loacker product assortment is sold, and a confectionery, where people can enjoy freshly baked goods and high-quality coffee. The Cafés are located at historically and strategically important sites to the company, including Bolzano's Piazza Walther in its historic city center, the Twenty shopping mall, the Outlet Center Brennero, Piazza Fiera in Trento and Heinfels, right next to Loacker's production site in Eastern Tyrol.

Competition 
Some of Loacker's competitors on both national and international markets include:

 Baileys The Original Irish Cream Chocolate Twists
 Baileys The Original Irish Cream Mini Delights
 Callebaut Rubens - Bastoncini di Cioccolato Bianco
 Callebaut Van Gogh Marmorizzato - Bastoncini di Cioccolato Bianco e Fondente
 Tunnock's Real Milk Chocolate Caramel Wafer Biscuits
 Manner
 Galbusera
 Ferrero
 Bahlsen
 Milka
 Milky Way Crispy Rolls

References

External links
 Company website
  Loacker U.S. website
 

Food and drink companies established in 1925
Manufacturing companies based in South Tyrol
1925 establishments in Italy
Italian brands
Confectionery companies of Italy